Bartuğ Elmaz (born 17 February 2003) is a Turkish professional footballer who plays as a midfielder for French club Marseille in the Ligue 1.

Professional career

Galatasaray
Elmaz is a product of Galatasaray's youth academy. On 17 November 2020, Elmaz signed his first professional contract with Galatasaray. He made his professional debut for Galatasaray in the 3-1 Süper Lig win over Göztepe S.K. on 22 December 2020.

Marseille
In January 2022, he signed a pre-contract deal to join Marseille. In June 2022, he officially joined them.

International career
Elmaz is a youth international for Turkey, having represented the Turkey U15s, U16s, and U17s.

References

External links
 
 

2002 births
Living people
People from Tekirdağ Province
Turkish footballers
Turkey youth international footballers
Galatasaray S.K. footballers
Süper Lig players
Association football midfielders
Olympique de Marseille players